Karlsruhe-Durlach station is the second largest station in the city of Karlsruhe in the German state of Baden-Württemberg after Karlsruhe Hauptbahnhof. It is used by services of the Karlsruhe Stadtbahn and the Rhine-Neckar S-Bahn, regular regional services and occasional long-distance trains.

History

Old station 

The original Durlach station was opened in the then independent community of Durlach along with the Heidelberg–Karlsruhe section of the Rhine Valley Railway, opened on 10 April 1843 by the Grand Duchy of Baden State Railway. The old station was east of the current station. After the opening of the new Durlach station in 1911, the old station lost its importance and it was closed in 1913. Its freight yard, which was south of the station still existed in 1990, but its site had been built over by 2000. The Rhine Valley Railway was originally built as a  line. Along with the other lines of the Baden State Railways, it was converted to standard gauge in 1854. In 1859 the line to Mühlacker was opened.

New station 
The new Durlach station was opened on 9 December 1911 and required a slightly different route for the Mühlacker line to reach it. The building of the station primarily served to eliminate a bottleneck between Durlach and Karlsruhe Hauptbahnhof, caused by the need for trains from Mühlacker to cross the tracks of the Rhine Valley Railway to reach the station.

In 1992, a two-track Karlsruhe Stadtbahn line was built on the northwest side of the station, which branches off Durlacher Allee to Durlach station and then crosses a bridge over the Rhine Valley line to connect with the Karlsruhe–Mühlacker line. The Stadtbahn stop is built parallel with the main line station with two side platforms and is served by lines S4 and S5. All the platforms are connected by a passenger subway.

In 2003 and 2005 the platforms of Durlach station were completely renovated for €4.5 million, as part of a project of the Rhine-Neckar S-Bahn and the Albtal-Verkehrs-Gesellschaft to make the station accessible for the disabled. This involved raising the main line platform edges to 76 cm. The platforms at the Stadtbahn stop were maintained at their original height of 55 cm, as it was not part of the Rhine-Neckar S-Bahn project.

Operations

Long distance

Regional Transport

Rhine-Neckar S-Bahn

Karlsruhe Stadtbahn

Trams
The tram stop is located some 150 metres from the railway station on Durlacher Allee and is called Auer Straße.

Notes

External links 

Durlach
Railway stations in Germany opened in 1843
1843 establishments in Baden
Karlsruhe Stadtbahn stations
Mannheim–Karlsruhe–Basel railway